Abbassia is a station on Cairo Metro, part of phase 1 of the Line 3. It is located in Abbassia square, one of the largest and important places of Greater Cairo.

History 
Abbassia Station was inaugurated on 21 February 2012 as part of phase 1 of Line 3. It serves several nearby governmental authorities and hospitals.

The station was considered the eastern terminus of the line until the inauguration of phase 2 on 7 May 2014, and Al Ahram Station became the eastern terminus of Line 3.

Overview 
The station consists of three floors, with four entrances and elevators to transport passengers from the street level to the station platform.

In addition, the station have a contactless fare collection system as well as an integrated supervision and communication system supplied by the Thales Group.

Station layout

Notable places nearby 
 North Cairo Primary Court
 Al-Noor Mosque
 Saint Mark's Coptic Orthodox Cathedral
 El-Waily Traffic Department
 HQ, Central Military Region
 Ministry of Electricity and Renewable Energy (MOEE)
 Rural Electrification Authority (REA)
 Civil Status Organization (CSO)
 Ain Shams University as well as other schools
 Old Police Academy
 Abbassia Bus Station
 Abbassia Chest Hospital
 Abbassia Fever Hospital
 Abbassia Psychiatric Hospital

Artwork 
The station's main artwork is the Tutankhamen's crown, which was modified to take the form of ancient Egyptian architecture.

The artwork was inspired by the Ain Shams University, which is the most famous landmark in Abbassia. Ayn Shams means "well" or "eye of the sun", which references the ancient Ptolemaic Heliopolis which in turn was named for the importance of the cult of Ra in the ancient Egyptian capital Iunu, hence the usage of Tutankhamen's crown to symbolize that era.

Accidents 

On 26 April 2015, a train crashed into a buffer stop while coming out of maintenance on a branch line and going back to the main rail, the driver sustained injuries with no injuries among the passengers.

See also 
 Cairo Metro
 Cairo Metro Line 3
 List of Cairo Metro stations

References

External links 
 Cairo Metro
 

Cairo metro stations
2012 establishments in Egypt
Railway stations opened in 2012